Ēriks Punculs (born 18 January 1994) is a Latvian professional footballer who plays as a forward for Valmiera and the Latvia national team.

Career
Punculs made his international debut for Latvia on 9 September 2019 in a UEFA Euro 2020 qualifying match against North Macedonia, which finished as a 0–2 away loss.

Career statistics

References

External links
 
 
 

1994 births
Living people
Footballers from Riga
Latvian footballers
Association football forwards
Latvia international footballers
Latvian Higher League players
FK Liepājas Metalurgs players
FK Spartaks Jūrmala players
FS METTA/Latvijas Universitāte players
Riga FC players
FK Liepāja players
Valmieras FK players
Latvian expatriate footballers
Latvian expatriate sportspeople in Spain
Expatriate footballers in Spain